The National Network of Abortion Funds (NNAF) is a national social justice organization that aims to increase access to abortion for low-income people across the U.S.

Founding and history 

The National Network of Abortion Funds is a social justice organization that was founded by 22 grassroots abortion funds from 14 states at a conference held May 1–2, 1993, at the National 4H Center in Chevy Chase, Maryland. The NNAF incorporated in 1994. A six-person national board was elected at the 1993 conference, and each board member was assigned several funds for which they had networking and communicating responsibilities.

Since 1994, the NNAF has charged its board with increasing the organization's diversity of age, race, and ethnicity. From 1993 to 2003, the NNAF functioned with minimal paid infrastructure: office space was donated by Hampshire College, Marlene G. Fried served as unpaid executive director and fundraiser, Shawn Towhey acted as unpaid communications director, and other national board members coordinated and implemented the programmatic work of the organization through task forces. Beginning in 1998, grants from the David and Lucile Packard Foundation enabled the NNAF to hire three consultants (development, organizational, and technology), which enabled it to reach new levels of sustainability and growth. In 2005, the board created the position of National Case Manager to oversee distribution of monies specifically designated for abortion funding. Currently, the NNAF is the only national organization that focuses on abortion rights that is led entirely by black women.

The NNAF now consists of well over 80 grassroots organizations in 38 states and four different countries. Funding is provided through donations from business and individuals, and is divided into each of these individual organizations. The NNAF works as an umbrella group to provide networking opportunities between these smaller individual organizations that are typically state-based to raise and divide funds and obtain the necessary technology to be able to directly support women seeking assistance with obtaining an abortion.

In 2000, the NNAF joined with 200 organizations to begin a campaign fighting against the injustice of the Hyde Amendment and punitive welfare reform. In 2016, the NNAF rallied alongside thousands of other organizations after the ruling that the state of Texas cannot place restrictions on abortion services that cause an undue burden. In 2017, the NNAF grew to include individual people as members.

The Affordable Care Act (ACA) also plays a role in the foundations and history of the NNAF. In 2009, negotiations regarding the ACA served as a catalyst to reinforce the Hyde Amendment restrictions that were already in place. Some of these restrictions included the continuous limiting of federal funds that could potentially fund abortions that endanger the life of the woman at hand or that are the result of incest, foul play, or rape. In the years that followed, Democratic political leadership made a point to strengthen abortion restrictions primarily due to their counterparts in the opposing political party being more so in favor for the changes made. During this time period, Democratic representation believed any efforts made to weaken abortion related restrictions would result in the overturning of the changes altogether. This also left the potential for reallocation of these funds that were previously used for abortion related funding. The additional restrictions added via the Affordable Care Act resulted in angry protesting and general disapproval from numerous different reproductive justice oriented groups across the nation. 25% of states currently ban abortion coverage in the marketplace under the Affordable Care Act.

The NNAF places a large emphasis on being able to actually help women in need with maternal health related issues and services. Yet simultaneously, the NNAF is not able to work asynchronously and must still abide by both state and federal mandate imposed by the government. Because of these regulations, it is crucial that there is a means to invoke a system of checks upon political party leaders in order to keep both sides accountable for their respective actions.

The National Network of Abortion Funds seeks to create powerful members who feel empowered to remove fiscal and logistical barriers regarding the logistics of abortion access to all people. The National Network of Abortion Funds seeks to obtain this goal by centering on people who choose to have abortions and organizing numerous different aspects of radical, economic, and reproductive justice that may be included with these ideals. The National Network of Abortion Funds strives to create a new type of society which promotes the concept of a woman having the ability to freely choose her own reproductive identity. This explanation implicitly implies cultivating a world where every single reproductive decision and action is accessible and affordable to all women regardless of factors the potential mother may be unable to control on her own. This foundation also strives to give women a safe space where they would not feel uncomfortable affirming their own bodies, identities, and healthcare related choices. This adjacency is to be not only for themselves, but also for their immediately impacted family members. The organization primarily focuses on shifting the previous connotations of abortion and making abortion a more accessible option to all women. This journey will not only include education regarding abortion itself, but also overall stigma reduction which will impact the commonly perceived taboo nature of abortions. The National Network of Abortion Funds fights to give agency to all women in order to allow them to have the power and resources to care for and affirm their own bodies. The National Network of Abortion Funds is hopeful that these events will not only lead to an improved healthcare system and operation, but also for the betterment of society as a whole.

The primary way this organization receives funding is through common place abortion funds. This specific type of funding is typically attached to a non-profit type of organization that provides financial and logistical assistance to individuals who do not have the fiscal means to pay for abortions on their own. Abortion funds play a role in financing countless different abortion services in numerous different countries where abortion may be legal, but simultaneously inaccessible to the inhabitants of any given geographic region. In order to achieve this, member of these organizations work across networks in order to remove or lessen specific barriers. Some staff members work in the clinical setting in order to help those in need pay for their abortion. There are also professional medical staff members employed to safely perform abortion related procedures. However, there are a plethora of other individuals staffed for purposes such as translation, transportation services, childcare, doula services, and even assisting those who may have had to travel far distances in order to have their abortion locate affordable and often reduced price housing accommodations to stay overnight if need be. This organization specializes in being diverse, giving as much autonomy as possible to their clients, and uniting all types of people regardless of their race, religion, creed, ethnicity, or socioeconomic status. The National Network of Abortion Funding does this in order to foster a culture where reproductive rights, specifically abortion, are free of any form of excessive coercion. This organization is currently affiliated with over 80 different organizations all specializing in varying forms of reproductive healthcare. The National Network of Abortion Funds provides infrastructure support, leadership development services, and organizational technical assistance to members in need, in addition to being a powerful political force focused on normalization of reproductive healthcare for all and positive social change. The main fighting and call to action slogan utilized by the National Network of Abortion Funding is “Fund abortion, Build Power!” because a healthy space for reproductive rights is a direct indication of the healthiness of their clientele and inhabitants of any given geographic location. By building an active grassroots base of individuals directly impacted by barriers to abortion access, they are able to increase their outreach and positively implement political and cultural change for reproductive healthcare rights. Abortion fund staff and employees are specifically trained to be aware of the cultural diversity that is often attached to helping individuals from numerous different backgrounds, cultures, geographic regions, and religious backgrounds. Staff members are instructed to make a point to uphold integrity while working with differing types of people all seeking abortion care services. Through a shared vision of collective power and participatory processes in partnership with their members, the National Network of Abortion Funds strives to build an environment that encourages people to take ahold of their reproductive health.

The National Network of Abortion Funds places a specific emphasis on intersectionality. This in itself revolves around the idea of systems of oppression. This is a foundation that firmly believes in the comprehensive vision of justice for all; and specific inclusion of working towards a common goal regardless of gender, race, or other related reproductively related rights. The National Network of Abortion Funds highlights its autonomy and ability to serve the population regardless of the numerous accounts of backlash and rumors that have been previously distributed among such origins. The National Network of Abortion Funds strives to cultivate an environment of shared power as opposed to a totalitarian based organizational ruling regime. This is an organization determined to build a base of shared power from the ground up while also making a point to simultaneously stand alongside other likeminded movements as a sign of solidarity. Finally, the National Network of Abortion Funds revolves around a sense of community and compassion. In order to properly instill this specific type of foundations, they advocate for a reduction of shame and stigmatization that can often be attached not only to women who choose to receive abortions, but also adequate reproductive health and rights as well. An increased sense of compassion for these individuals can result in a happier and healthier lifestyle for all humans regardless of where they might fall on the progressive or reproductive justice spectrum. In juxtaposition, reproductive coercion is a factor that not only has the ability to burden this individuals, but also instills barriers to reproductive healthcare rights and negatively encourages numerous forms of sexual, mental, and physical violence for victims.

Mission 
The NNAF works to facilitate networking and to provide support and technical assistance to local member funds, which in turn provide direct financial and logistical assistance to women seeking abortions. The organization also conducts national and state-based advocacy to ensure that those most in need (low-income women, women of color, and young women) have access to abortion and full reproductive health care. In 2000, the Fund spearheaded the Campaign for Access to Reproductive Equity, which aimed to reverse the Hyde Amendment and make it possible for people to secure Medicaid funding for abortions.

Studies have found that financial assistance provided by abortion funds is essential for women who are not able to afford out of pocket abortion costs, and it is particularly beneficial for patients of color, women who already have at least one child, and those who are younger and single. Since Medicaid only covers medically necessary abortions in 16 states—defined by rape, incest, or life endangerment of the mother by carrying a child or giving birth—the majority of women only qualify for financial assistance through the NNAF. Since the majority of states ban abortion coverage, many women are required to travel to a different state to gain access to abortions, which is unaffordable the majority of patients without additional resources.

Currently, organizations within the NNAF can only afford to provide funds to about 26% of the women who call them seeking financial assistance for travel, lodging, abortion, care, and other costs related to obtaining a safe abortion. Thus, the NNAF has begun providing practical assistance—like translation services and emotional and informational resources—to help women. In 2014, the NNAF received over a hundred thousand requests for financial assistance and contributed about $3.5 million for over thirty thousand people to be able to afford abortion services. $90,000 was given to 1,500 of these individuals for assistance within the practical assistance category. This is not enough. Almost 75% of these calls result in no assistance—not because the individual does not qualify or because of local guidelines—but because there simply was not any money left. These vulnerable women, typically young women living below the poverty line and with at least one child, have no way to access abortions without the support from the NNAF.

NNAF is a member of several national coalitions, including the Training and Access Working Group (TAWG), the Communications Group (communications directors from pro-choice organizations), and SisterSong Women of Color Reproductive Health Collective. The NNAF is currently partnered with two organizations—All* Above* All and Strong Families.

The NNAF strives to ensure that every reproductive decision, not just abortion, becomes safe, attainable, and affordable to all people. Their vision is that all people have the rights and resources needed to be able to make their own educated reproductive decisions and obtain the services that each individual deems necessary to them. The organization has four values—intersectionality, autonomy, collective power, and compassion.

While the primary reason individuals seek assistance from the NNAF is for financial assistance, they are consistently working diligently both behind the scenes and in high pressure situations like court rooms to promote political and cultural changes so that low-income women, women of color, younger women, transgender men, and gender nonconforming people are able to safely access reproductive care. The organization as a whole, as well as individual members, call the governmental representatives to action. The NNAF also provides resources for all people on subjects like presidential races, crisis relief campaigns, creating networks, policy changes, and moral and ethical laws. This allows the organization to help every individual person—if not financially, then through the impact of being aware and fighting for justice with the goal that all people will be able to obtain healthcare.

The NNAF does not require any proof of needing assistance aside from having an abortion scheduled and a few questions about income. They do not check identities, do not check immigration status, and never ask for proof of citizenship. Since so many undocumented women are forced to cancel appointments or obtain abortions unsafely and illegally, they work to ensure that each individual is able to find a provider where they are not at risk for facing repercussions like immigration raids or even prosecution. Following their four values and their vision, they believe that each and every person should have control of their reproductive care and be able to make their own health-related choices, regardless of who they are or where they come from, and they continue to fight tirelessly for this social justice.

References

External links 

National Network of Abortion Funds records at the Sophia Smith Collection, Smith College Special Collections

Abortion-rights movement in the United States
Reproductive rights in the United States
Reproductive rights organizations
Organizations established in 1994
Abortion in the United States